Bernardini is a family name of Italian origin.

Geographical distribution
As of 2014, 72.1% of all known bearers of the surname Bernardini were residents of Italy (frequency 1:2,561), 7.8% of France (1:25,728), 7.5% of Brazil (1:82,665), 5.3% of the United States (1:204,559) and 3.9% of Argentina (1:33,341).

In Italy, the frequency of the surname was higher than national average (1:2,561) in the following regions:
 1. Tuscany (1:525)
 2. Umbria (1:660)
 3. Lazio (1:786)
 4. Liguria (1:1,074)
 5. Marche (1:1,267)

People
 Alain Bernardini, band's singer I Muvrini
 Albino Bernardini (1917-2015), Italian writer and pedagogue
 Adriano Bernardini (born 1942), Italian Roman Catholic prelate of the Catholic and former diplomat of the Holy See
 Alessandro Bernardini (born 1987), Italian footballer
 Antonino Bernardini (born 1974), Italian footballer
 Attilio Bernardini (1888-1975), Brasilian classical guitarist
 Carlo Bernardini (artist) (born 1966), Italian artist
 Carlo Bernardini (politician) (1930-2018), Italian physicist and politician 
 Charles Bernardini, alderman of Chicago's 43rd Ward from 1993 until 1999
 Dean Bernardini (born 1973), American bass guitarist and backing vocalist
 Domenico Antonio Bernardini (1647-1723), Roman Catholic Bishop of Mileto and later Bishop of Castellaneta 
 Ernani Bernardini (1911-2006), big-band musician turned politician in Los Angeles
 Filippo Bernardini (1884-1954), Italian Roman Catholic Archbishop
 Fulvio Bernardini (1905-1984), Italian footballer and coach
 Jean François Bernardini, band's singer I Muvrini
 Laurentius Bernardini (17th century),  Roman Catholic Titular Bishop of Coronea
 Marcello Bernardini (died 1799), Italian composer and librettist
 Mariano Bernardini (born 1998), Italian football player
 Micheline Bernardini (born 1927), French dancer
 Rita Bernardini (born 1952), Italian politician
 Roberto Bernardini (born 1944), Italian professional golfer
 Severino Bernardini (born 1966), Italian long-distance runner
 Simone Bernardini (born 1991), Italian racing cyclist
Tomas Bernardini de la Huerta (born 1868), Lawyer - San Juan Puerto Rico
 Tiago Bernardini (born 1979), Brazilian footballer

References
 

Italian-language surnames
Surnames of Italian origin
Patronymic surnames
Surnames from given names